Olympiad   (foaled February 5, 2018) is an American multiple graded stakes winning Thoroughbred racehorse. His graded stakes wins include the Grade I Jockey Club Gold Cup at Saratoga Race Course, the Grade II New Orleans Classic Stakes at the Fair Grounds and the Grade II Stephen Foster Stakes at Churchill Downs.

Background

Olympiad is a bay horse who was bred in Kentucky by Emory A. Hamilton, a son of Speightstown, winner of the 2004 Breeders' Cup Sprint and was named that year's Champion sprinter. He is the third foal from the Medaglia d'Oro mare Tokyo Time and her first graded stakes winner. Olympiad was bought on behalf of the ownership group for $700,000 by Solis/Litt Bloodstock from the Gainesway consignment to the 2019 Keeneland September Yearling Sale. In 2022 his sire Speightstown stands at WinStar Farm for US$75,000.

His dam Tokyo Time is a half sister to graded stakes winners Hungry Island and Soaring Empire in addition to Flying Dixie, the dam of 2019 Grade 1 Woodward Stakes victor and sire Preservationist. In 2022 his sire Speightstown stands at WinStar Farm for US$75,000.

Olympiad is trained by U.S. Racing Hall of Fame trainer William I. Mott.

Career highlights

Olympiad won his first Grade I in the Jockey Club Gold Cup at Saratoga Race Course starting as the 17/10 favorite and winning by two lengths in a time of 2:02.11 for the  miles distance.

Olympiad finished second to Flightline in the 2022 Breeders' Cup Classic at Keeneland Racecourse.

Statistics

Notes:

An (*) asterisk after the odds means Olympiad was the post-time favorite.

Stud career
It was announced on October 24, 2022, that upon his retirement from racing, Olympiad will take up stallion duties at Gainesway Farm.

Pedigree

Olympiad is inbred 3s × 4d to Mr Prospector.

References

2018 racehorse births
Racehorses bred in Kentucky
Racehorses trained in the United States
Thoroughbred family 13-d
American Grade 1 Stakes winners
Horse racing track record setters